Jason M. Sheppard (born August 25, 1978) is an American politician from Michigan. Sheppard is a Republican member of the Michigan House of Representatives from District 56.

Early life 
On August 25, 1978, Sheppard was born in Toledo, Ohio.

Education 
Sheppard attended Michigan State University and University of Toledo.

Career 
Sheppard is a commercial real estate agent with Signature & Associates. Sheppard also runs a small business that he owns and founded 17 years ago.

On November 4, 2014, Sheppard won the election and became a Republican member of Michigan House of Representatives for District 56. On November 8, 2016, as an incumbent, Sheppard won the election and continued serving District 56. On November 6, 2018, as an incumbent, Sheppard won the election and continued serving District 56.

Personal life 
Sheppard's wife is Melissa. Sheppard lives in Temperance, Michigan. Sheppard is Baptist.

References

External links 
 Jason Sheppard at gophouse.org
 Jason Sheppard at ballotpedia.org

Living people
1978 births
Michigan State University alumni
University of Toledo alumni
Republican Party members of the Michigan House of Representatives
Baptists from Michigan
Politicians from Toledo, Ohio
21st-century American politicians